Ylan Gomes (born 22 July 2002) is a French professional footballer who plays as a forward for  club Paris 13 Atletico on loan from Le Havre AC.

Professional career
Gomes made his professional debut with Le Havre in a 3-1 Ligue 2 win over En Avant Guingamp on 12 September 2020.

On 27 January 2023, Gomes was loaned by Paris 13 Atletico.

Personal life
Gomes is the son of Bissau-Guinean footballer Amarildo Gomes, who was developing at Beauvais and Rennes before retiring through a knee injury. He is the brother of the footballer Claudio Gomes.

References

External links

 HAC Foot Profile
 FFF Profile

2002 births
French people of Bissau-Guinean descent
Sportspeople from Eure
Footballers from Normandy
Living people
French footballers
France youth international footballers
Association football forwards
Le Havre AC players
Paris 13 Atletico players
Ligue 2 players
Championnat National players
Championnat National 2 players
Championnat National 3 players